Embra, Īmbra, or ʿmbra is the third month of the Mandaean calendar.

It is the Mandaic name for the constellation Aries. It currently corresponds to Sep / Oct in the Gregorian calendar due to a lack of a leap year in the Mandaean calendar.

References

Months of the Mandaean calendar
Aries in astrology